Tredegar General Hospital was a community hospital in Tredegar, Blaenau Gwent, Wales. It was managed by the Aneurin Bevan Local Health Board.

History
In 1901, the Tredegar Medical Aid Society convened a public meeting to discuss the establishment of a hospital and eventually a committee of more than 30 members was set up to build and manage it. Land for the new hospital was donated by Lord Tredegar. Funding came from the Tredegar Iron and Coal Company, other local employers and organisations, private and public donations and by the workmen mainly from the pits who agreed to maintain the hospital by having an extra halfpenny a week deducted from their wages. It was opened as Tredegar Park Cottage Hospital in December 1904.

Walter Conway was employed as secretary of the Medical Aid Society from 1915 and contributed to making the community health scheme a success. A.J. Cronin, whose 1937 novel, The Citadel, brought much attention to Tredegar's grassroots healthcare system, worked as a doctor at the hospital during the early 1920s. Aneurin Bevan, founder of the National Health Service, became a member of the Cottage Hospital Management Committee around 1928 and was chairman between 1929 and 1930.

After services transferred to the new Ysbyty Aneurin Bevan in Ebbw Vale, Tredegar General Hospital closed in 2010. The health board has proposed that a Health and Wellbeing Centre be established on the site.

References

External links
History of healthcare in the South Wales Coalfield

Hospital buildings completed in 1904
Defunct hospitals in Wales
Hospitals established in 1904
Hospitals disestablished in 2010
Tredegar
Hospitals in Blaenau Gwent